Aleksandr Moiseyevich Volodin (1919–2001), born Lifschitz, was a Soviet and Russian playwright, screenwriter and poet. His first play was The Factory Girl (1956). His most famous plays were Five Evenings (1959), My Elder Sister and some others. In addition, he created the script for the film Autumn Marathon (1979) by director Georgy Daneliya.

References

External links
 Recent Trends in Russian Drama with Special Reference to Alexander Volodin
 

1919 births
Writers from Minsk
2001 deaths
Soviet dramatists and playwrights
Russian dramatists and playwrights
Soviet screenwriters
Recipients of the Vasilyev Brothers State Prize of the RSFSR
Recipients of the Order "For Merit to the Fatherland", 3rd class
Gerasimov Institute of Cinematography alumni
Russian writers
Soviet Jews
Belarusian Jews
Russian Jews
Russian people of World War II
20th-century Russian screenwriters
Male screenwriters
20th-century Russian male writers